Drunk History is an American television series.

Drunk History may also refer to:

 Drunk History (British TV series), the British version of the show
 Drunk History (Mexican TV series), the Mexican version of the show
 Drunk History Australia, the Australian version of the show